Solo (Skopje) 1995 is a live solo album by composer and saxophonist Anthony Braxton recorded at the Skopje Jazz Festival in 1995 and released on his own Braxton House label.

Track listing
All compositions by Anthony Braxton except where noted
 "Composition No. 191a" – 16:56
 "Composition No. 191b" – 8:53
 "Composition No. 191c" – 6:39
 "Easy Living" (Ralph Rainger, Leo Robin) – 10:12
 "Composition No. 191d" – 8:47
 "Composition No. 191e" – 6:00
 "Composition No. 191f" – 9:22
 "East of the Sun (and West of the Moon)" (Brooks Bowman) – 5:03

Personnel
 Anthony Braxton – alto saxophone

References

Anthony Braxton live albums
1997 live albums